Mane Aliya is a 1964 Indian Kannada-language film, directed by  S. K. A. Chari and produced by A. V. Subba Rao. The film stars Kalyan Kumar, Jayalalitha, K. S. Ashwath and Balakrishna in the lead roles. The film has musical score by T. Chalapathi Rao. The film was a remake of the Telugu film Illarikam (1959).

Cast

Kalyan Kumar
Jayalalitha
K. S. Ashwath
Balakrishna
Narasimharaju
Dikki Madhavarao
M. P. Shankar
Guggu
Rangabhoomi Narayan
Hanumanthachar
Shivaji
H. R. Sharma
Thangappan
Vasudeva Girimaji
Anantharao
Sandhya
Rama
Vanishree
Suryakala
Lakshmidevi Thalikote
Geetha
Thara

Soundtrack
The music was composed by T. Chalapathi Rao.

References

External links
 

1964 films
1960s Kannada-language films
Kannada remakes of Telugu films
Films scored by T. Chalapathi Rao